This is a list of the French Singles & Airplay Chart Reviews number-ones of 1978.

Summary

Singles Chart 

On the week of December 29, 1978, both songs shared the top position of the charts.

See also
1978 in music
List of number-one hits (France)

References

1978 in France
1978 record charts
Lists of number-one songs in France